Genine Graham (9 December 1926, London – 11 May 1997, London) was an English actress. She trained at LAMDA, and played the title role of the mermaid Miranda in the original West End production of Peter Blackmore's play, later filmed with Glynis Johns. She also appeared on Broadway opposite Katharine Hepburn in a revival of Bernard Shaw's The Millionairess in 1952; and presented the TV series Mail Call (1955–56) with her husband John Witty.

Filmography

References

External links

1926 births
1997 deaths
Actresses from London
English stage actresses
English film actresses
English television actresses
20th-century English actresses